Jeff Dadamo (born July 17, 1989) was an American professional tennis player who competed mainly on the ATP Challenger Tour and ITF Futures, both in singles and doubles.

Dadamo reached his highest ATP singles ranking, No. 480, on October 15, 2012, and his highest ATP doubles ranking, No. 429, on February 4, 2013.

Career finals (1)

Doubles (1)

References

External links

American male tennis players
1989 births
Living people
Florida Gators men's tennis players
Texas A&M Aggies men's tennis players
Tennis people from Florida